Beyond All Odds is a 1926 American silent Western film directed by Alan James and starring Eileen Sedgwick.

Plot
Betty Mason (Eileen Sedgwick) seeks revenge in the murder of her brother, Dan (Theodore Henderson), as well as the kidnapping of her finance.

"Girl avenges death of brother and abduction of sweetheart by killing villains instrumental in causing both crimes." -- Motion Picture News Booking Guide, 1926

Cast
 Eileen Sedgwick as Betty Mason  
 Karl Silvera as George Baker  
 Ray Childs as Casino Joe  
 Theodore Henderson as Dan Mason  
 Les Bates as Ritch Walker  
 Lew Meehan as Cory Forbes  
 Alfred Hewston as Sheriff  
 Dutch Maley as Hard Rock Jordan

Themes
Unlike many classic Westerns, especially of the silent era, this film displays the female lead as the hero, who avenges both the death of her brother and the kidnapping of her finance by killing those responsible for both crimes.

References

External links
 

1926 films
1926 Western (genre) films
Films directed by Alan James
Chesterfield Pictures films
American black-and-white films
Silent American Western (genre) films
1920s English-language films
1920s American films